Nondenominational Christianity (or non-denominational Christianity) consists of churches which typically distance themselves from the confessionalism or creedalism of other Christian communities by not formally aligning with a specific Christian denomination. Many non-denominational churches have a congregationalist polity, which is self-governing without a higher church authority.

Nondenominational Christianity arose in the 18th century through the Stone-Campbell Restoration Movement, with followers organizing themselves simply as "Christians" and "Disciples of Christ".

Often congregating in loose associations such as the Churches of Christ, or in other cases founded by individual pastors, few are affiliated with historic denominations, but many adhere to a form of evangelical Christianity. Most nondenominational Christians in the United States fall under Protestantism.

History

Nondenominational Christianity first arose in the 18th century through the Stone-Campbell Restoration Movement, with followers organizing themselves simply as "Christians" and "Disciples of Christ". Congregations in this tradition of nondenominational Christianity often refer to themselves as Churches of Christ.

Independent nondenominational churches continued to appear in the United States in the course of the 20th century.

Nondenominational congregations experienced significant and continuous growth in the 21st century, particularly in the United States. If combined into a single group, nondenominational churches collectively represented the third-largest Christian grouping in the United States in 2010, after the Roman Catholic Church and Southern Baptist Convention.

In Asia, especially in Singapore and Malaysia, these churches are also more numerous, since the 1990s.

Characteristics 

Nondenominational churches are not affiliated with specifically denominational stream of evangelical movements, either by choice from their foundation or because they separated from their denomination of origin at some point in their history. Like denominational congregations, nondenominational congregations vary in size, worship, and other characteristics. Although independent, many nondenominational congregations choose to affiliate with a broader network of congregations, such as IFCA International (formerly the Independent Fundamental Churches of America).

Nondenominational churches are recognizable from the evangelical movement, even though they are autonomous and have no other formal labels.

The movement is particularly visible in the megachurches.

The neo-charismatic churches often use the term nondenominational  to define themselves.

Some non-denominational churches identify solely with Christianity.

Criticism
Boston University religion scholar Stephen Prothero argues that nondenominationalism hides the fundamental theological and spiritual issues that initially drove the division of Christianity into denominations behind a veneer of "Christian unity". He argues that nondenominationalism encourages a descent of Christianity—and indeed, all religions—into comfortable "general moralism" rather than being a focus for facing the complexities of churchgoers' culture and spirituality. Prothero further argues that it also encourages ignorance of the Scriptures, lowering the overall religious literacy while increasing the potential for inter-religious misunderstandings and conflict.

Baptist ecumenical theologian Steven R. Harmon argues that "there's really no such thing" as a nondenominational church, because "as soon as a supposedly non-denominational church has made decisions about what happens in worship, whom and how they will baptize, how and with what understanding they will celebrate holy communion, what they will teach, who their ministers will be and how they will be ordered, or how they relate to those churches, these decisions have placed the church within the stream of a specific type of denominational tradition." Harmon argues that the cause of Christian unity is best served through denominational traditions, since each "has historical connections to the church's catholicity ... and we make progress toward unity when the denominations share their distinctive patterns of catholicity with one another."

Presbyterian dogmatic theologian Amy Plantinga Pauw writes that Protestant nondenominational congregations "often seem to lack any acknowledgement of their debts and ties to larger church traditions" and argues that "for now, these non-denominational churches are living off the theological capital of more established Christian communities, including those of denominational Protestantism." Pauw considers denominationalism to be a "unifying and conserving force in Christianity, nurturing and carrying forward distinctive theological traditions" (such as Wesleyanism being supported by Methodist denominations).

In 2011, American evangelical professor Ed Stetzer attributed to individualism the reason for the increase in the number of evangelical churches claiming to be non-denominational Christianity.

See also

 Evangelicalism
 Protestantism in the United States
 History of Protestantism in the United States
 Community Church movement
 Jesuism
 Local churches
 Non-church movement
 Non-denominational Muslim
 Non-denominational Judaism
 Postdenominationalism
 Sunday Christian

Notes

References

External links
 Nondenominational Congregations Study

 
Ecclesiology
Christian terminology